Hanzade Sultan ("descendent of the Khan";  1609 - 21 September 1650) was an Ottoman princess, the daughter of Sultan Ahmed I (r. 1603–1617) and Kösem Sultan. She was a half sister of Osman II (r. 1618–1622) and a sister of Murad IV (r. 1623–1640) and Ibrahim I (r. 1640–1648), and the paternal aunt of Mehmed IV (r. 1648–1687), Suleiman II (r. 1687-1691) and Ahmed II (r. 1691-1695).

Life
Hanzade Sultan was born in 1609. She was the daughter of Sultan Ahmed I. Her mother was Kösem Sultan. After her father's death in 1617, she settled in the Old Palace.

Hanzade married Ladliki Bayram Pasha, who was then the agha of the Janissaries in 1623 in the Old Palace. Esin Akalin, notes that her elaborate bridal procession was escorted among the cheering crowds in the streets of Istanbul by the vezirs of the Sultan. By this marriage, Hanzade had a daughter who name is unknown and who probraly died in infancy. 

After Bayram's death in 1638, she married vezir Nakkaş Mustafa Pasha in October 1639 in the Bayram Pasha Palace.

During the reign of her brother Ibrahim, her stipend consisted of 400 aspers per day. Late in his reign, she fell, for reasons unknown, in disgrace and was submitted, alongside her sisters Ayşe and Fatma and niece Kaya Sultan, to the indignity of subordination of his concubines. He took away their lands and wealth, and made them serve his newest favourite, Hümaşah, by standing at attention like servants while she ate and by fetching and holding the soap, basin and the pitcher of water with which she washed her hands. Because of what he believed was failure to serve her properly, the Sultan then banished them to Edirne Palace.

Death
Hanzade Sultan died on 21 September 1650, and was buried in the mausoleum of her brother Sultan Ibrahim in Haghia Sophia.

See also
 List of Ottoman Princesses

References

Sources
 

17th-century Ottoman princesses
1608 births
1650 deaths